is a Japanese four-panel manga series by Hinako Seta, serialized in Houbunsha's Manga Time Jumbo magazine. Re-Kan! was first published as a one-shot in Manga Time Jumbo December 2009 issue, and it later began serialization with the February 2010 issue. It has been collected into twelve tankōbon volumes. A 13-episode anime television series adaptation by Pierrot+ aired in Japan between April and June 2015.

Overview
High school girl Hibiki Amami has a sixth sense of perceiving and interacting with ghosts and supernatural beings, as well as talking with cats and other animals, but none of her peers share that ability. After transferring to Hanazuka Prefectural High School, she becomes friends with some classmates who put up with her antics, including class representative Narumi Inoue, who despises anything related to the occult. The story follows their everyday antics.

Characters

Humans

 (anime), Aya Endō (drama CD)
A beautiful high school student who has the ability to sense and to interact with supernatural beings such as ghosts and spirits, passed down from her late mother. She is very polite and always treats both humans and ghosts alike with respect.

 (anime), Haruka Tomatsu (drama CD)
Hibiki's classmate who becomes friends with her, despite being generally terrified of the ghosts surrounding her. She is usually not too honest with her feelings and is considered a "granny's girl", often being haunted by the spirit of her late grandmother.

 (anime), Kana Hanazawa (drama CD)
Hibiki's classmate who is childhood friends with Kyōko. Her hobby is taking pictures of ghosts, which become visible when viewed through a cellphone camera, and uploading them to her top-ranked supernatural blog.

 (anime), Eri Kitamura (drama CD)
Hibiki's classmate who is childhood friends with Kana. She has a rough personality, usually being the first to attack Kenta when he acts stupid, but is compassionate and helps those in trouble. She is a former delinquent, with the nickname , almost always getting angry when someone brings it up.

 (anime), Ayana Taketatsu (drama CD)
Hibiki's classmate. A bright and cheerful airhead who has an obsession with creepily made zombie dolls, of which her friends are often fearful.

 (anime), Yusuke Shirai (drama CD)
Hibiki's classmate, and the sole male in her group of friends. Often considered a doofus among his friends, his overly cheerful attitude and sometimes dimwitted remarks often get him clobbered by Kyōko.

 (anime), Shin-ichiro Miki (drama CD)
Hibiki's father. Similar to Narumi, he doesn't like ghosts, and the relationship with his wife and her supernatural ability made his hair turn prematurely white over a short duration of time.

 (anime), Sumire Uesaka (drama CD)
Narumi's younger cousin, whose father died.

Kenta's older brother who works as a police officer. He has a crush on Kyōko, whom he had previously encountered during her delinquent days.

Ghosts

 (anime), Kenyu Horiuchi (drama CD)
The ghost of a samurai who died of starvation. After Amami gave him food, he started to protect her and do anything for her in any way he can, such as answering to her teacher for roll call when Hibiki falls asleep in class.

 (anime)
A spirit who haunts one of the stalls in the school's girls' restroom.

 (anime), Norio Wakamoto (drama CD)
A cute but lecherous cat that constantly tries to take peeks at girls' panties, though is often thwarted by the ghosts protecting Hibiki.

 (anime)
A ghost with long grey hair who haunts others, usually Kana, through phone calls.

 (anime), Aimi Terakawa (drama CD)
 A kogal ghost girl who initially possesses Hibiki in order to make peace with her mother, but chooses to stick around. She appears to have a rivalry with the Roll Call Samurai.

 / 
 (anime)
 A ghost girl in a sailor uniform who carries a red umbrella, which she offers to those who need shelter from the rain. She has no neck in the manga and no face in the anime.

 (anime), Nobuo Tobita (drama CD)
A jibakurei that protects the local park, bound to the sign at the entrance. His figure is never seen.

 (anime), Kyōko Hikami (drama CD)
Hibiki's late mother, who died when Hibiki was born. While alive, her sixth sense was said to be much stronger than her daughter's, and she occasionally made prophecies with her ability. She currently resides within Hibiki's memories, looking after a trellis of flowers giving Hibiki her sixth sense.

The spirit of Inoue's grandmother who is constantly watching over her.

Media

Manga
The original manga by Hinako Seta was first published in Houbunsha's Manga Time Jumbo magazine in the December 2009 issue, and went into serialization from February 2010. An anthology comic was released on May 7, 2015. It moved to Manga Time for the May issue on April 7, 2018 when Jumbo was discontinued. Twelve tankōbon volumes have been released as of September 7, 2021.

Anime
A 13-episode anime television series adaptation by Pierrot+ aired in Japan between April 3, 2015 and June 26, 2015 and was simulcast by Crunchyroll. (Ibuki Kido and Erii Yamazaki). Sentai Filmworks has licensed the anime for digital and home video release in North America.

Episode list

Reception
Anime News Network (ANN) had three editors review the first episode of the anime: Theron Martin gave praise to the humor being mostly delivered by both Inoue and Amami, and the upbeat, sugary charm used throughout the episode; Rebecca Silverman found the episode confused with either being a comedic or slice-of-life supernatural show and preferred that it stick with the latter subgenre with its human moments and work out its comedy elements. The third reviewer, Jacob Hope Chapman, heavily criticized the show's cheap production for its workmanlike animation clashing with the shoddy CG backgrounds and felt the humor was undone by poor direction and writing. He concluded that there's similar anime with better writing and aesthetics compared to this, saying that, "There's just not anything unique or intriguing about this one." Fellow ANN editor Paul Jensen reviewed the complete anime series in 2016. He commended the spiritual humor, the different interactions both Narumi and Hibiki have with the ghosts, and the moments of sweetness and melancholia throughout the various episodic storylines but was critical of the series overall not pushing forward its brand of comedy and drama beyond mildly entertaining and lacked the "sense of wonder or magic" humans have when interacting with spirits in their world compared to similar otherworldly series like Mushi-Shi and Flying Witch, concluding that "On the whole Re-Kan! is an enjoyable show that's worth a look if you've got a taste for lighthearted comedy or the slice of life genre in general."

Notes

References

External links
 Anime official website 
 

Anime series based on manga
Comedy anime and manga
Houbunsha manga
Sentai Filmworks
Studio Signpost
Seinen manga
Yonkoma